Francis Davy Longe (25 September 1831 – 20 February 1910) was an English first-class cricketer, lawyer, anti-classical economist and inspector for the Local Government Board.

Early life and family 
Longe was born in September 1831 at Coddenham Vicarage in Suffolk to the Rev. John Longe. Longe was educated at Harrow School where he boarded at The Head Master’s. Longe later attended Oriel College, Oxford where he graduated with a BA in 1854. Longe was a student at Inner Temple and was called to the bar on 30 April 1858. Longe's ancestor was Pocahontas.

Cricket 
At Harrow and Oxford, Longe excelled at cricket, eventually becoming the captain of Harrow School Cricket XI team, playing at the famous Eton v Harrow match held annually at Lord's Cricket Ground between 1847 and 1850. At Oxford, Longe played first-class cricket for Oxford University team between 1850 and 1851 and Marylebone Cricket Club.

Career 
Francis D. Longe served on a British commission on child labour from 1862- to 1867.  In economics, he is best known for his anti-classical 1866 tract, making him one of the first persons to demolish the Ricardian Wages-Fund doctrine. In this, Longe was followed up independently by W.T. Thornton. Longe also wrote a number of other books including:
 An Inquiry into the Law of 'Strikes''', 1860.
 A Refutation of the Wage-Fund Theory of Modern Political Economy as enunciated by Mr. Mill, MP and Mr. Fawcett, M.P., 1866.
 A Critical Examination of Mr. George's Progress & Poverty and Mr. Mill's Theory of Wages, 1883.
 Lowestoft in Olden Times'', 1899.

See also
 List of Oxford University Cricket Club players

References

External links
 

1831 births
1910 deaths
English cricketers
Oxford University cricketers
People educated at Harrow School
Alumni of Oriel College, Oxford
Marylebone Cricket Club cricketers
English economists